The 12 cm/12 short naval gun was a naval gun used by the Imperial Japanese Navy to defend merchant ships and land bases during World War II.

History
Since Japan is an island nation with relatively few resources it relied upon a large merchant fleet to import the resources needed for its industry and economy.  As Japanese shipping losses mounted during World War II the Japanese began to organize their shipping into escorted convoys and they began arming their merchant ships to defend against attacks from Allied surface combatants, submarines and carrier-based aircraft.  The 12cm/12 short naval gun was a multi-purpose gun introduced during 1941 which combined the roles of naval gun, anti-aircraft gun, coastal defense gun, and anti-submarine gun.

Design 
The 12 cm/12 short naval gun was an autofretted monoblock gun with an interrupted screw breech that fired fixed QF ammunition.  The trunnioned gun barrel had a hydro-spring recoil mechanism above and below the barrel and was mounted on a center pivot H/A L/A gun mount.  The gun was normally mounted on merchant ships below 5,000 GRT and also saw use on land as a coastal defense gun on hills overlooking Japanese harbors and installations or as an anti-aircraft gun.  It was described as being a light and easy to handle hand trained weapon that could be loaded at any angle by inexperienced gun crews.  However, its rate of elevation/traverse 13° a second was considered too slow for effective anti-aircraft use.

Ammunition 
 Anti-aircraft
Anti-submarine
 High explosive - Length: , Weight: , Explosive weight: , Explosive: TNA.
 Illumination
 Incendiary
 Shrapnel

Similar weapons 
20 cm/12 short naval gun - A similar Japanese anti-submarine gun used during the latter half of World War II.
BL 7.5-inch naval howitzer - A British anti-submarine gun used during the latter half of World War I.
 8 inch Mark 7 & Mark 8 - Two American anti-submarine guns designed late in World War I that never entered service.

References

Bibliography

External links

Naval guns of Japan
120 mm artillery
Weapons and ammunition introduced in 1941